Adam Ondra (born February 5, 1993) is a Czech professional rock climber, specializing in lead climbing and bouldering. In 2013, Rock & Ice described Ondra as a prodigy and the leading climber of his generation. Ondra is the only male athlete to have won World Championship titles in both disciplines in the same year (2014) and is also the only male athlete to have won the World Cup series in both disciplines (lead climbing in 2009, 2015, and 2019 and bouldering in 2010).

At age 13, Ondra had climbed his first route graded . Rock & Ice reported that by 2011, Ondra was "onsighting 5.14c's by the handful" and, by 2013, had "more or less repeated every hard route in the world—easily".

According to The Economist, Ondra is "regarded as possibly the best climber ever to fondle rock".

Climbing career

Early years

Ondra started climbing at the age of six; his parents are climbers, and they shared their passion with him.  In 1999, at age six, in Rovinj, Croatia, Ondra climbed a  route with bolts every half meter. He quickly rose to fame, appearing in climbing magazines as his accomplishments became both more impressive and frequent:
 In 2001, (at age eight), he onsighted  routes. 
 In 2002, (at age nine), he onsighted  and redpointed . 
 In 2003, (at age ten), he onsighted . 
 In 2004, (at age eleven), he onsighted  and redpointed . 
 In 2005, (at age twelve), he onsighted .
 In 2006, (at age thirteen), he managed to redpoint his first , Martin Krpan at Misja Pec.

Climbing competitions

In 2007 and 2008, he won the IFSC World Youth Championship, category Youth B.  In 2009, at age sixteen, Ondra competed for the first time in the Lead Climbing World Cup, finishing ahead of Spanish Patxi Usobiaga and Japanese Sachi Amma.  In 2010, he won the Bouldering World Cup, beating Austrian climber Kilian Fischhuber and Tsukuru Hori from Japan, becoming the first athlete in history to win the World Cup in both disciplines (lead and bouldering).

Ondra failed to qualify for the 2020 Summer Olympics at the 2019 IFSC Climbing World Championships, as he was disqualified for accidentally toeing a bolt during the lead climbing portion of the combined event. However, at the Olympic qualifying event in Toulouse later that year, he managed to secure a place in the Olympic Games, despite falling ill after reaching the finals of the event.

In April 2021 Ondra won gold in the bouldering discipline at the IFSC World Cup in Meiringen, Switzerland. This marked his 20th World Cup gold medal.  In August 2021, Ondra finished in sixth place at the 2020 Summer Olympics.

Rock climbing

During a March 2011 trip to Spain, Ondra became the second-ever person to onsight a  route, after Patxi Usobiaga.

On February 7, 2013, Ondra ascended La Dura Dura in Oliana, Catalonia, Spain, his second  after Change. He worked on this project with American climber Chris Sharma, and the first ascent took Ondra nine weeks.  On February 9, 2013, two days after La Dura Dura, Ondra succeeded in the second ascent of the  route, Fight or flight, first climbed by Sharma in 2011.  On July 9, 2013, Ondra realized the second-ever onsight of a  route in history, after Alexander Megos, with the ascent of Cabane au Canada in Rawyl, Switzerland.

On November 21, 2016, Ondra completed the second free ascent of the 1,000-metre granite route, The Dawn Wall, a 32-pitch grade  big wall climbing route at El Capitan in the Yosemite Valley. The route was widely regarded as the hardest big wall climbing route in the world. Ondra lead every pitch and completed the project in 8 days (the first ascenders, Tommy Caldwell and Kevin Jorgeson alternated leads, and spent 19 days on the wall).

On April 23, 2017, Ondra set a new highpoint for Black Diamond's The Project indoor sport route in Stockholm, Sweden, which is believed to be the hardest in the world.

On September 3, 2017, after about 4 years of dedicated work and training, Ondra climbed Silence, in the Hanshelleren Cave in Flatanger, Norway. On February 10, 2018, Ondra completed the world's first-ever flash of a confirmed  route with his ascent of Super Crackinette in Saint-Léger du Ventoux, France.

Rankings

Climbing World Cup

Climbing World Championships 
Youth

Adult

Climbing European Championships

Rock Master

Number of medals in the Climbing European Youth Cup

Lead

Number of medals in the Climbing World Cup

Lead

Bouldering

Single-pitch routes 
The table below shows the large number of routes graded  or more ascended by Adam Ondra in about 16 years, from August 2, 2002 (when he redpointed his first 8a) to November 10, 2018.

Redpoint 
:
 Silence (originally known as Project hard) - Flatanger (NOR) - September 3, 2017 - First ascent, and world's first-ever proposed  route (the grade has to be confirmed).

:
 Zvěřinec (Menagerie) - Holštejn (CZE) - November 20, 2022 - First ascent - Adam claims this as his hardest 9b+ and therefore the second hardest route of his life.
Vasil Vasil - Sloup v Čechách (CZE) - December 4, 2013 - First ascent
 La Dura Dura - Oliana (ESP) - February 7, 2013 - First ascent
 Change - Flatanger - October 4, 2012 - First ascent, and the world's first-ever  route.

:
 Wonderland - Arco (ITA) - March 2022 - First ascent. Ondra graded the route 9b/9b+ or hard 9b, making it the hardest route in Italy.
 Bomba - Arco (ITA) - March 2022 - First ascent
 The Lonely Mountain - Arco (ITA) - December 2021. Second ascent after Stefano Ghisolfi.  
 Taurus - Býčí skála (CZE) - December 2021 - First Ascent
 Erebor - Arco (ITA) - November 2021
 Neanderthal - Santa Linya (ESP) - February 12, 2019
 Disbelief - Acephale (CAN) - July 20, 2018 - First ascent 
 Eagle-4 - St. Léger (FRA) - February 13, 2018 - First ascent
 One Slap - Arco (ITA) - November 13, 2017 - First ascent
 Move Hard - Flatanger (NOR) - July 10, 2017 - First ascent (link-up of two neighboring routes; through first crux of Move into second crux of Silence, at the time known as Project Hard)
 Lapsus - Andonno (ITA) - April 20, 2017 - Second ascent 
 Queen Line - Laghel (Arco, ITA) - April 19, 2017 - First ascent 
 Mamichula - Oliana (ESP) - February 8, 2017 - First ascent 
 Robin Ud - Alternativna stena - October 5, 2016 - First ascent
 Stoking the Fire - Santa Linya (ESP) - February 19, 2016 - Second ascent of Chris Sharma's route
 C.R.S. - Mollans sur Ouvèze (FRA) - November 2, 2015 - First ascent
 First Round First Minute - Margalef (ESP) - February 3, 2014 - Second ascent of Chris Sharma's route
 Move - Flatanger (NOR) - August 20, 2013 - First ascent. Ondra graded the route "9b/9b+, or just hard 9b". Repeated on June 17, 2019 by Seb Bouin, who later on upgraded the route to 9b+.
 Iron Curtain - Flatanger (NOR) - August 3, 2013 - First ascent
 Fight or flight - Oliana (ESP) - February 9, 2013 - Second ascent of Chris Sharma's route (2011)
 La planta de Shiva - Villanueva del Rosario (ESP) - April 22, 2011 - First ascent
 Chilam Balam -Villanueva del Rosario (ESP) - April 13, 2011 - Second ascent (however Bernabe Fernandez's first ascent is not confirmed)
 Chaxi Raxi - Oliana (ESP) - March 27, 2011 - First ascent of Chaxi direct start
 La Capella - Siurana (ESP) - February 16, 2011 - First ascent
 Golpe de Estado - Siurana (ESP) - March 13, 2010 - Second ascent of Chris Sharma's route (2008)

:

Bohemian Rhapsody - Velká (CZE) - April, 2020 - First Ascent
Catxasa - Santa Linya (ESP) - February 10, 2019
Czech trip  - Mavrovi Anovi (MKD) - October 19, 2018 - First Ascent
Sacrifice - Echo Canyon (CAN) - July 23, 2018 - First ascent
Stone Butterfly - Herculane (ROU) - May 15, 2018 - First ascent
Underground Dreaming - Arco (ITA) - February 24, 2018 - First ascent
Super Crackinette - Saint-Léger du Ventoux (FRA) - February 10, 2018 - Flash
Naturalmente - Camaiore (ITA) - April 21, 2017 - First ascent
Ultimatum - Massone (Arco, (ITA) - April 19, 2017 - third ascent 
Predator - Bohemian Karst (CZE) - November 19, 2015 - first ascent, the hardest route in Bohemia
Three Degrees of Separation - Céüse (FRA) - July 27, 2015 - second ascent of Chris Sharma's route (2007)
Realization - Céüse (FRA) - July 22, 2014 - tenth ascent
Ini Ameriketan - Baltzola (ESP) - May 9, 2014
Hell Racer - Hell (NOR) - September 22, 2013 - first ascent
Kangaroo's Limb - Flatanger (NOR) - September 21, 2013 - first ascent
Torture Physique Integrale - Gastlosen (CHE) - July 7, 2013 - first ascent
Power Inverter - Oliana (ESP) - January 25, 2013 -  second ascent of Chris Sharma's route (2010)
Thor's Hammer - Flatanger (NOR) - July 8, 2012 - first ascent (now downgraded to 9a)
Jungle Boogie - Céüse (FRA) - June 7, 2012 - first ascent
Perlorodka - Holstejn (Moravsky Kras, CZE) - September 6, 2011 - first ascent
Overshadow - Malham Cove - May 16, 2011 - Second ascent of Steve McClure's route
Chaxi - Oliana (ESP) - March 21, 2011 - first ascent of Chris Sharma's project
Obrint el sistema - Santa Ana (ESP) - March 14, 2011 - first ascent of Daniel Andrada's project
L'étrange ivresse des lenteurs - Céüse (FRA) - September 4, 2010 - First ascent
Goldrake - Cornalba (ITA) - April 6, 2010 - first ascent
Marina Superstar - Domusnovas (ITA) - October 20, 2009 - first ascent
Corona - Frankenjura (DEU) - June 7, 2009 - second ascent of Markus Bock's route (2006)
Papichulo - Oliana (ESP) - February 24, 2009 - second ascent of Chris Sharma's route (2008)
Open Air - Schleierwasserfall (AUT) - November 17, 2008 - second ascent of Alexander Huber's route (1996)
La Rambla - Siurana (ESP) - February 10, 2008 - sixth ascent

On-sight 

:
TCT - Gravere (ITA) - July 11, 2014
 Il Domani - Baltzola (ESP) - May 3, 2014
 Cabane au Canada - Rawyl - July 9, 2013 - Second-ever 9a onsight in history
 Water World - Osp (SLO) - Nov 2023 - 

:

Blut und Honig - Höllental (AUT) - September 30, 2019
Just Do It - Smith Rock (Oregon, USA) - November 12, 2018
C'est la vie - Alternatívna stena (SVK) - October 5, 2016
Super Plafond - Volx (FRA) - July 6, 2014
Chambao - Baltzola (ESP) - May 7, 2013
Pure Imagination - Red River Gorge (USA) - November 1, 2012
Golden Ticket - Red River Gorge (USA) - November 1, 2012
Muy Verdes - Flatanger (NOR) - July 11, 2012
Eye of Odin - Flatanger (NOR) - July 8, 2012
Deltaplane Man Direct - Entraygues (FRA) - May 31, 2012
Bella Regis - Bus De Vela (ITA) - April 7, 2012
L'Avaro - Tetto di Sarre (ITA) - July 13, 2011
La Rubia - Villanueva del Rosario (ESP) - April 13, 2011
Blanquita - Oliana (ESP) - March 27, 2011
Mind Control - Oliana (ESP) - March 20, 2011
Powerade - Vadiello (ESP) - March 9, 2011
Bizi Euskaraz - Etxauri (ESP) - March 7, 2011
Kidetasunaren balio erantsia - Etxauri (ESP) - March 6, 2011 - Second-ever 8c+ onsight in history after Bizi Euskaraz by Patxi Usobiaga in 2007

:
 Aktion Talon - Höllental (AUT) - June 29, 2013
 Into the Wild - Jaén (ESP) - March 16, 2013
 Terapia de Grito - Cuenca (ESP) - February 13, 2013
 El Calvario del Sicario - Cuenca (ESP) - February 10, 2013
 Nordic Flower - Flatanger (NOR) - July 9, 2012
 Scoglio de Capri - Bus De Vela (ITA) - April 7, 2012
 Iluzija - Kotecnik (SVN) - April 5, 2012
 5 Uve - Arco (ITA) - June 27, 2011
 Bat Route - Malham Cove (GBR) - May 16, 2011
 Carbunco - Archidona (ESP) - April 23, 2011
 Kalliste - Archidona (ESP) - April 23, 2011
 Fuck the police - Etxauri (ESP) - March 6, 2011
 Dures Limites - Céüse (FRA) - August 10, 2010
 Smoke - Pierrot beach (FRA) - August 5, 2010
 Home Sweet Home - Pierrot beach (FRA) - August 5, 2010
 Guère d'usure - Claret (FRA) - January 29, 2010
 Super Samson - Claret (FRA) - January 29, 2010
 Gora Guta Gutarak - Kalymnos - May 22, 2009
 Una Vida Nomada - Covolo (ITA) - April 21, 2009
 Nagay - Covolo (ITA) - April 21, 2009
 L'espiadimondis - Margalef (ESP) - March 2, 2009
 Los Humildes Pa Casa - Oliana (ESP) - February 24, 2009
 Métaphysique Des Tubes - Seynes (FRA) - February 21, 2009
 Absinth - Sparchen (AUT) - August 16, 2008
 Rollito Sharma Extension - Santa Linya (ESP) - February 7, 2008
 Digital System - Santa Linya (ESP) - February 5, 2008

Boulder problems 
Ondra won the bouldering gathering Melloblocco in 2008, 2009 2010 and 2011.

Specifically:
 4 8C+/V16
 10 8C/V15
 31 8B+/V14
 57 8B/V13
 76 8A+/V12
 115 8A/V11

:
 Brutal Rider - Moravian Karst (CZE) - May 25, 2020 - First ascent 
 Ledoborec - Moravian Karst (CZE) - May 24, 2020 - First ascent 
 Gioia - Varazze (ITA) - December 6, 2011 - Second ascent of Christian Core's boulder (2008)
 Terranova - Holštejn (Moravian Karst, CZE) - November 10, 2011 - First ascent, traverse

:
 Vrtule - Holštejn (Moravian Karst, CZE) - October 13, 2017 - First ascent,

:
 Nunavut - Sloup (Moravian Karst), (CZE) - November 15, 2019 - First ascent
 Pučmeloun - Sloup (Moravian Karst), (CZE) - November 15, 2019 - First ascent
 Ghost Rider - (Moravian Karst), (CZE) - September 24, 2019 - Second ascent
 Cháron - Petrohrad (Mlýnský vrch), (CZE) - October 15, 2011 - First ascent
 Practice of the Wild - Magic Wood (CHE) - October 1, 2011 - Chris Sharma's boulder (2004)
 Pata ledovce - Holštejn (Moravian Karst, CZE) - September 6, 2011 - First ascent
 Monkey Wedding - Rocklands (ZAF) - August 14, 2011 - Third ascent of Fred Nicole's boulder (2002)
 From The Dirt Grows the Flowers - Chironico (CHE) - November 30, 2010 - Dave Graham's boulder (2005)
 Big Paw - Chironico (CHE) - November 29, 2010 - Third ascent of Dave Graham's boulder (2008)

Multi-pitch routes 

 The Dawn Wall - El Capitan (USA) - 3,000 feet (915 meters) tall - 32 pitches, at least two of which graded . Described as the hardest big wall in the world.
 January 14, 2015 - Redpointed by Tommy Caldwell and Kevin Jorgeson in 19 days, after 7 years of mapping.  
 November 21, 2016 - Redpointed by Adam Ondra in 8 days, after a few weeks of practicing the already mapped ascent.
 Mora Mora - Tsaranoro Atsimo - October 10, 2010 - First free ascent
 Bravo Les Filles - Tsaranoro Kelly (MDG) - October 7, 2010
 Tough Enough Original - Karambony (MDG)  - October 4, 2010 - First free ascent
 Tough Enough - Karambony (MDG) - September 30, 2010 - First free ascent
 Hotel Supramonte - Gole di Gorroppu (ITA) - October 18, 2008 - First onsight ascent
 Ali Baba - Paroi Derobée (Aiglun, FRA) - 2008 - Second ascent
 WoGü - Rätikon (CHE) - July 26, 2008 - First free ascent of Beat Kammerlander'''s route (1997)
 Zub za zub - Rätikon (CHE) - July 29, 2007 - First free ascent
 Silbergeier - Rätikon (CHE) - July 27, 2007

 Filmography 

 The Fanatic Search - 2009 - Produced by Work Less Climb More and Laurent Triay
 Progression - 2009 - by Josh Lowell - Produced by Big UP ProductionsThe Wizard's Apprentice - 2012 - Directed by Petr Pavlíček - Produced by Bernartwood - 110'Reel Rock Tour 7 - 2012 - Produced by Big UP ProductionsLa Dura Complete: The Hardest Rock Climb In The World - 2014 - Part of Reel Rock 7 by Big Up ProductionsChange - 2014 - Directed by Petr Pavlíček - Produced by Bernartwood - Silence—The Story of Adam Ondra and the World's First 5.15d - 2018 - by Bernardo Giménez - Produced by AO Production s.r.o.
Ondra is also producing his own video series about qualifying and competing in the 2020 Summer Olympics, released on YouTube, called Road to Tokyo.

 Books 

 JAROS, Martin; ONDRA, Adam. Adam Ondra: lezec telem i dusi. Albatros, 2019. 200 p.
 ONDRA, Adam; GIMENEZ, Bernardo; BIBA, Lukas. Adam Ondra Book''. AO Production, 2019. 223 p.

Awards 
 2008 Salewa Rock Award
 2010 Salewa Rock Award
 2011 Salewa Rock Award
 2013 Salewa Rock Award

See also 
List of grade milestones in rock climbing
History of rock climbing
Rankings of most career IFSC gold medals
Chris Sharma, American rock climber
Sébastien Bouin, French rock climber, frequent climbing-partner with Ondra

References

External links 

 
 

 
 
 
 

1993 births
Living people
Czech rock climbers
Sportspeople from Brno
Sport climbers at the 2020 Summer Olympics
Olympic sport climbers of the Czech Republic
IFSC Climbing World Championships medalists
IFSC Climbing World Cup overall medalists
Boulder climbers